Por siempre mi amor (English title: Forever yours) is a Mexican telenovela produced by Ignacio Sada for Televisa. It is a remake of Mi segunda madre, produced by Juan Osorio in 1989.

Susana González and Guy Ecker star as the protagonists, while Thelma Madrigal and Pablo Lyle star as the co-protagonists. Dominika Paleta, Héctor Suárez Gomís, Sofía Castro and Lola Merino star as the antagonists.

Plot
Arturo De La Riva is a successful architect who has been happily married to Eugenia for ten years, and they have a daughter, Aranza. However they do not imagine that Sonia, Eugenia's cousin, is secretly obsessively in love with Arturo and secretly hates Eugenia for that and tries to get rid of her by secretly switching Eugenia's medications, causing her a coma, to have Arturo for herself.

Meanwhile, Isabel López Cerdán is a successful interior decorator who has been married, for two years, to Fernando Córdova, whom she loves above all else.

Eugenia passes away, coinciding with the time Isabel discovers that Fernando is a swindler who has been stealing her money and also has been married to a young woman named Andrea for ten years and has two sons with her, Esteban and Angel, the latter having been born while Fernando was supposedly married with Isabel, so Isabel has him sent to jail.

After these blows, Isabel and Arturo are united by destiny in a paradise-like beach of Mexico, initiating a relation that will have to overcome different obstacles like Sonia's manipulation of Aranza, so that she does not accept Isabel and also Fernando who escapes from jail to get revenge on both Isabel and Andrea.

Cast

Main

Susana González - Isabel López Cerdán de De la Riva
Guy Ecker - Arturo De la Riva Acevedo
Dominika Paleta - Sonia Arenas Lozano
Héctor Suárez Gomís - Fernando Córdova Miranda / Javier Castillo de la Fuente
Ana Martín - María Luisa "Tita" Valverde Vda. de Escudero
Zuria Vega - Eloisa De La Riva

Also main

Martha Julia - Gabriela "Gaby" San Román
Macaria - Minerva Gutiérrez
Humberto Elizondo - Osvaldo de la Riva
Luz María Zetina - Eugenia Arenas de De la Riva
Lola Merino - Marcela Zambrano 
Víctor Noriega - Fabricio De la Riva Oropeza
Gabriela Platas - Andrea Gutiérrez de Córdova / de Narváez
Alejandro Ruiz - Bruno Escudero Valverde
Alejandro Aragon - Mauricio Narváez
Isabel Martínez "La Tarabilla" - Cuca
Carlos Bonavides - Padre Adalberto
Ricardo de Pascual - Gabino Hidalgo
Dacia González - Lucha de Hidalgo
Archie Lafranco - Nicolás Belmonte
Dacia Arcaráz - Ágatha
Elena Torres - Almudena Quijano de Escudero
Silvia Lomelí - Teresa
Thelma Madrigal - Aranza De la Riva Arenas
Pablo Lyle - Esteban Narváez Gutiérrez
Tania Lizardo - Marianela
Sofía Castro - Dafne Quintana Herrera
Carlos Speitzer - Pablo Noriega "El Borlas"
Jade Fraser - Ileana Portillo
Erick Díaz - Cristian
David Ostrosky - Gilberto Cervantes
Pablo Cruz Guerrero - Daniel Cervantes Arenas

Special participation

Francisco Rubio - Gonzalo Carbajal
Emma Escalante - Gemma
José Montini - Baltazar
Alejandro Villeli - Efrén Gómez
Juan Verduzco - Dr. Elías Carranza
Karyme Hernández - Aranza (girl)
Federico Porras - Esteban (boy)
Camila Peña - Dafne (girl)
Valentina Hauzori - Ileana (girl)

Broadcast
Production of Por Siempre mi Amor officially started on August 15, 2013.

On October 7, 2013, Canal de las Estrellas started broadcasting Por Siempre mi Amor weekdays at 4:15pm, replacing Corazón indomable. The last episode was broadcast on May 4, 2014, with La Gata replacing it the following day.

On December 2, 2013, Univision started broadcasting Por Siempre mi Amor on weeknights at 8pm/7c, replacing one hour of Corazón Indomable. The last episode was broadcast on May 9, 2014, with two hours of De que te quiero, te quiero replacing it on May 12, 2014.

Awards and nominations

References

External links

Mexican telenovelas
2013 telenovelas
Televisa telenovelas
2013 Mexican television series debuts
Spanish-language telenovelas
2014 Mexican television series endings